Broncho (stylized as BRONCHO) is an American indie rock band formed in 2010 in Norman, Oklahoma. The current lineup consists of Ryan Lindsey on guitar and vocals, Ben King on guitars, Penny Pitchlynn on bass and Nathan Price on drums.

History
Their debut album Can't Get Past the Lips originally came out in 2011 on Guestroom Records and Austin-based CQ Records and was later rereleased by Fairfax Recordings in 2013. Broncho released their second album Just Enough Hip to Be Woman on September 16, 2014, on Dine Alone Records. The album received generally favorable reviews from the music press.

The band's song "It's On" was played over the closing credits of "Females Only," the first episode of the third season of the HBO series Girls. "Try Me Out Sometime" was used in an advertisement for HBO Now and Movie 43. "Try Me Out Sometime" was also featured in the documentary, Valley Uprising. The track "Class Historian" was used in a commercial featuring Kate Hudson for her Fabletics brand of women's athletic clothing as well as Cartoon Network's bearstack campaign. "Class Historian" also appears on the soundtrack for Vacation, on the second episode of the second season of Santa Clarita Diet, and in the first episode of Reservation Dogs, while the kids sell their newly stolen Flaming Flamers product to locals. "Boys Got to Go" is featured on the soundtrack of the 2019 soccer video game, PES 2020. 

Their fourth album Bad Behavior came out in 2018. Described as slightly more "pop" than their previous efforts, it has been well received nonetheless.

Discography
Can't Get Past the Lips (2011)
Just Enough Hip to Be Woman (2014)
Double Vanity (2016)
Bad Behavior (2018)

References

Alternative rock groups from Oklahoma
Indie rock musical groups from Oklahoma